Eddoe or eddo is a tropical vegetable often considered identifiable as the species Colocasia antiquorum, closely related to taro (dasheen, Colocasia esculenta), which is primarily used for its thickened stems (corms). In most cultivars there is an acrid taste that requires careful cooking. The young leaves can also be cooked and eaten, but (unlike taro) they have a somewhat acrid taste.

Etymology
The English word 'eddo' is of Akan origin; cognate to Twi: o1de3 "yam"; and Fante: o1do3.

History and distribution
Eddoes appear to have been developed as a crop in China and Japan and introduced from there to the West Indies where they are sometimes called "Chinese eddoes". They grow best in rich loam soil with good drainage, but they can be grown in poorer soil, in drier climates, and in cooler temperatures than taro.

Eddoes are also sometimes called malangas in Spanish-speaking areas, but that name is also used for other plants of the family Araceae, including tannia (Xanthosoma spp.). Yautias is a more specific term.

Eddoes make part of the generic classification cará or inhame of the Portuguese language which, beside taro, also includes root vegetables of the genera Alocasia and Dioscorea. They are the most commonly eaten  in the states of São Paulo, Rio de Janeiro and Espírito Santo, as well as surrounding regions of all. They are also fairly common in Northeastern Brazil, where they might be called  (literally "potato"), but less so than true yams of the genus Colocasia. According to Brazilian folk knowledge, the eddoes most appropriate to be cooked are those that are more deeply pink, or at least pinkish lavender, in the area where the leaves were cut.

The 1889 book The Useful Native Plants of Australia records that Colocasia antiquorum:

Taxonomy
Linnaeus originally described two species which are now known as Colocasia esculenta and Colocasia antiquorum of the cultivated plants that are known by many names including eddoes, dasheen, taro, but many later botanists consider them all to be members of a single, very variable species, the correct name for which is Colocasia esculenta.

See also
Domesticated plants and animals of Austronesia

References

Aroideae
Root vegetables
Leaf vegetables
Tropical agriculture
Staple foods
Taros